Lahti Region Educational Consortium (Finnish: Päijät-Hämeen koulutuskonserni) is a joint municipality located in Southern Finland, 100 km from the capital of Helsinki.

Business Units

 Lahti University of Applied Sciences 
 Salpaus Further Education
 Tuoterengas

Municipalities

 Asikkala
 Hartola
 Heinola
 Hollola
 Hämeenkoski
 Kuhmoinen
 Kärkölä
 Lahti
 Nastola
 Orimattila
 Padasjoki
 Pertunmaa
 Sysmä

External links 
 Päijät-Hämeen koulutuskonserni (PHKK)
 Lahti Region Educational Consortium
 Lahti University of Applied Sciences
 Salpaus Further Education 
 Lahti

Lahti